Vengeance of the Deep is a lost 1923 film directed by Barry Barringer and starring Ralph Lewis, Virginia Brown Faire and Richard Arlen.

Cast
Ralph Lewis - Captain Musgrove
Virginia Brown Faire - Ethel Musgrove
Richard Arlen - Jean (*billed as Van Mattimore)
Harmon MacGregor - Frederico
William Anderson - Tagu
Bowditch M. Turner - Native Chief (as 'Smoke' Turner)
Maida Vale - Kiliki

References

External list
Vengeance of the Deep in the Internet Movie Database

1923 films
American silent feature films
1923 drama films
Silent American drama films
American black-and-white films
Lost American films
1923 lost films
Lost drama films
Films directed by Barry Barringer
1920s American films